Helen Williams may refer to:

Helen Williams (British civil servant) (born 1950)
Helen Maria Williams (1759–1827), British novelist
Helen Williams (Australian public servant) (born 1945), first woman appointed as Secretary of an Australian Government department
Helen Williams (model), American model
Helen Williams (curler) (born 1973), Australian curler
Helen Williams, character in Across the Plains
Helen Williams, character in The Blue Veil

See also
Ellen Williams (disambiguation)